Bandya Station, often referred to as Bandya, is a pastoral lease that operates as a sheep station.

Established in the early 1900s the property was initially known as Salt Soak Station. An early part owner was J. MacCalmont who also owned Laverton Downs Station.

In 1927, W. C. Hill was the owner of the property.

It was stocked with 2,000 cattle and 3,000 sheep. 

In the 1980s the property was running an average flock size of 15,000 sheep. The Hill family, who also owned Mount Weld Station located to the north of Bandya, were experiencing difficulties with feral dogs attacking stock on the property.

See also
List of ranches and stations

References

Shire of Laverton
Pastoral leases in Western Australia
Stations (Australian agriculture)